Plan 4 (sometimes also Plan Cuatro) is an Argentine heavy metal band from Buenos Aires that formed in 2003.

History 
After the dissolution of Raiz, three of its members, singer Javier Compiano, drummer Gonzalo Espejo and guitarist Leandro Zunni joined Diego Oviedo (former Hentai) to form Plan 4.
The band released their first EP, La Música Es Tu Mejor Arma. The EP contains a live versions "Destino" and "Libre" as well as the videoclip for "Destino"

Plan 4 has took part on the first ever Latin American tribute to Black Sabbath, titled "Sabbath Crosses" contributing the song "TV Crimes". They have also recorded "Somebody Put Something in My Drink" for a double CD tribute to The Ramones

In August 2005, Plan 4 released their first album, titled "Cambio De Piel" (Change of Skin), produced by Heaven Records and Dias De Garage. The CD has 14 tracks and was recorded, mixed and mastered at Estudios Abismo. The band promoted the album throughout Argentina with their "Cambio De Piel Tour 2005" and during 2006 as well.

Discography

EP 
Released in 2004
 Destino (Destiny)
 Libre (Free)
 El Principio O El Fin (The Beginning Or The End)
 Destino (live) (Destiny)
 El Principio O El Fin (live) (The Beginning Or The End)
 Videoclip for Destino

Cambio De Piel 
Released in 2005
 Latidos (Heartbeats)
 Entre La Vida Y La Muerte (Between Life And Death)
 Alma, Cuerpo Y Mente (Soul, Body And Mind)
 Destino (Destiny)
 Nuevo Amanecer (New Dawn)
 Reaccion En Cadena (Chain Reaction)
 Donde Estes (Wherever You Are)
 El Principio O El Fin (The Beginning Or The End)
 Cambio Mi Piel (I Change My Skin)
 La Fuerza (The Force)
 Libre (Free)
 Semillas (Seeds)
 Pppp (Pppp)
 Basta, Se Acabo! (Enough, It's Over!)

Dos Caras 
Edited in 2007
 Radiochaos
 El Mundo Gira (Igual)
 Ella
 La Jaula
 Señor de la Guerra
 En el Olvido
 Refugio
 Dos Caras
 Ardientes Corazones
 Más Allá de la Razón
 Condena
 El Sobreviviente
 La Ira de Dios
 Mi Religion

EXTRACHAOS Vol. 1 
Edited in 2008
 T.V Crimes (Black Sabbath)
 Somebody put something in my drink (Ramones)
 Skin o my teeth (Megadeath)
 Armas (Massacre)
 Supera el dolor
 Dos caras **
 Más alla de la razón **
 El principio o el fin **
 Entre la vida y la muerte **
 Destino **

** In Live

Tributes and compilations 

 Sabbath Crosses - Tribute to Black Sabbath, released in 2004
- TV Crimes

 Todos Somos Ramones (We Are All Ramones) - Homage to The Ramones, released in 2004
- Somebody Put Something in My Drink

 Hangar De Almas (Hangar of Souls) - Tribute to Megadeth, released in 2005
- Skin o' My Teeth

References

External links 
www.plancuatro.com.ar Official webpage, in Spanish

Argentine heavy metal musical groups
Argentine punk rock groups
Musical groups from Buenos Aires